Martin Tungevåg (born July 9, 1993), known professionally as Martin Tungevaag or simpily  Tungevaag, is a Norwegian DJ and music producer who placed at number #89 on the DJ Mag top 100 DJs list. He has achieved success in Europe, Asia and South America with the electronic songs "Samsara 2015", "Wicked Wonderland", "All for Love", "Bad Boy", "Dance", "Peru" and "Play" together with K-391, Alan Walker and Mangoo. He has been nominated at the Norwegian Spellemannprisen twice times: for Hit of the Year in 2015 with "Samsara 2015"; in the same category in 2020 with "Dance"; and for Best EDM Artist in 2019 at the Swedish Grammis. Tungevaag has over four billion worldwide streams on his music and received several gold and platinum certifications in several countries. It is currently ranked #81 on DJ Mag's Top 100.

Career
At the age of 15, Tungevaag began to explore different digital audio workstations (DAW) in his bedroom studio in 2008. On 12 June 2014, he signed with and started his music career at Kontor Records in Germany, scoring his first major hit in 2014 with "Wicked Wonderland". It became a summer hit and led to shows at clubs and festival main stages all over Europe. "Wicked Wonderland" was later certified platinum in Germany, Switzerland, Austria and Spain, quadruple platinum in Norway, as well as triple platinum in Sweden and Finland. In topped the chart in Austria and has over 130 million streams on Spotify.

In 2018, Tungevaag released "All for Love" through Warner Music and in 2019 "Million Lights" through Spinnin' Records. Later in the same year he worked with Alan Walker, K-391 and Mangoo on a remake of Mangoo's "Eurodancer" known as "Play". The single was released on 30 August 2019, was streamed over 760 thousand times on its day of release on Spotify, later reached the upper ranks of the charts in Norway, México, Sweden and Finland.

Tungevaag's track "Dance", made in collaboration with CLMD, received radio support and was streamed over 70 million times on Spotify in its first year. It was also nominated as for Hit of the Year at both the Spellemann (Norwegian Grammys) and at P3 Gull, the biggest Norwegian radio station. It was certified gold in Denmark, platinum in Sweden and double platinum in Norway. 

His track "Miss You", released through Spinnin', debuted on the Dutch Top 40 at number 37, reaching number 19 on 16 April 2021.

Discography

Singles

As Tungevaag & Raaban:
2015: "Samsara"	
2015: "Parade"
2015: "Russian Roulette" 
2016: "Wolf"
2016: "Magical"
2016: "Beast" (feat. Isac Elliot)
2017: "Wake Up Alone"
2017: "Cold Blood"
2017: "Coming Up"
2018: "All for Love"
2018: "Bad Boy"
2018: "Hey Baby"
2019: "Million Lights"
2019: "Try Again"
2019: "Take Me Away"

Remixes
2020: Rat City and Kiesza — "Naked (With My Headphones On)" (Tungevaag Remix)
2020: Hoved and Tungevaag — "Let You Go" (Tungevaag Edit)

Awards and nominations

References

Norwegian DJs
Norwegian record producers
1993 births
Living people
Musicians from Ålesund
Electronic dance music DJs